Sir John Preston, Lord Fentonbarns (died 1616), of Penicuik, was a Scottish lawyer and judge who became lord president of the court of session.

Life
He was the son of a burgess, town councillor, and dean of guild in Edinburgh. John Preston was admitted advocate at the Scottish bar before 20 October 1575. He frequently appeared in cases before the privy council. On 8 March 1595 he was elected an ordinary lord of session.

Preston's attendance at the Privy Council on 24 November 1596. The same year he was, along with Edward Bruce, named king's commissioner to the general assembly of the kirk. Several further royal commissions followed. He was a member of a committee of lawyers and ministers including John Russell, Robert Rollock and the Provost Henry Nisbet who drew up a syllabus for the University of Edinburgh in July 1598 including readings from Latin authors. 

A letter from James VI of June 1599 mentions his involvement in crown finance. The King had instructed him to repay a sum of money advanced on the security of some of the jewels of Anne of Denmark to the goldsmith and financier George Heriot. Preston however, had reserved the money for the costs of an embassy to France. On 2 October 1601 he was named one of eight commissioners to assist the treasurer in the administration of his office. In recognition of his services James VI, on 10 February 1602, conceded to him and his wife, Lilias Gilbert, the lands of Guthrie in Midlothian, and on 30 March 1604 the lands of Penicuik with others lands in the same shire.

As a member of the Privy Council, Preston went with others to Stirling Castle in May 1603 to discuss and investigate a controversy involving Anne of Denmark who wished to take custody of her son, Prince Henry. Preston was one of the assessors at the trial in 1606 of the ministers concerned in holding the Aberdeen assembly. He was elected vice-president of the court of session on 23 October 1607, to act in the absence of Lord Balmerino, the president; was one of the assessors at the trial of Balmerino in 1608; and, on Balmerino's removal from the presidency, was, on 6 June 1609, chosen to succeed him.

About the end of April 1611 Preston was appointed one of a council of eight—the New Octavians—in whom the financial offices of the treasurership, the collectorship, and the comptrollership were vested. He died on 14 June 1616.

Family
By his wife, Lilias Gilbert, daughter of the goldsmith Michael Gilbert, Preston left a son John, on whom a baronetcy of Nova Scotia was conferred in 1628. By his marriage to Elizabeth, daughter of William Turnbull, the younger John Preston became possessor of the lands of Auchie, Fife, on which a mansion-house was erected, named Prestonhall. The baronetcy is now extinct.

His daughter Katherine married John Morison, Treasurer of the City of Edinburgh, and they were parents to Alexander Morison, Lord Prestongrange.

Notes

Attribution

1616 deaths
Members of the Faculty of Advocates
Lords President of the Court of Session
Octavians
People from Midlothian
Senators of the College of Justice
Year of birth missing